Apewosika is a community in the Nzema East Municipality in the Western Region of Ghana.

Facility 
There is a fish cold storage facility located in the community of Apewosika.

References 

Western Region (Ghana)
Communities in Ghana